In organic chemistry, acid hydrolysis is a hydrolysis process in which a protic acid is used to catalyze the cleavage of a chemical bond via a nucleophilic substitution reaction, with the addition of the elements of water (H2O). For example, in the conversion of cellulose or starch to glucose. For the case of esters and amides, it can be defined as an acid catalyzed nucleophilic acyl substitution reaction.

The term is also applied to certain nucleophilic addition reactions, such as in the acid catalyzed hydrolysis of nitriles to amides. Acid hydrolysis does not usually refer to the acid catalyzed addition of the elements of water to double or triple bonds by electrophilic addition as may originate from a hydration reaction.

Acid hydrolysis is used to prepare monosaccharide with the help of acids, such as:

 Hydrochloric acid 
 Sulfuric acid
 Trifluoroacetic acid
 Formic acid
 Nitric acid

Acid hydrolysis can be utilized in the pretreatment of cellulosic material, so as to cut the interchain linkages in hemicellulose and cellulose.

See also 
 Alkaline hydrolysis
 Enzymatic hydrolysis
 Acid catalysis

References 

Chemical reactions